Chien Shih-Liang aka S. L. Chien (1908–1983), was a Chinese chemist who served as the President of the Academia Sinica. A graduate of Tsinghua University and the University of Illinois at Urbana Champaign, he also served as President of National Taiwan University.

Biography
Chien was from Hangzhou, Zhejiang. After graduating from Tianjin Nankai High School, he matriculated at Tsinghua University Department of Chemistry in 1927. He won the Boxer Indemnity Scholarship Program in 1931 and went to the United States together with Wu Ta-You. Chien continued his study in chemistry at the University of Illinois at Urbana Champaign (UIUC) where he obtained M.Sc. in 1932 and Ph.D. in 1934.

Chien returned to China after obtaining PhD and joined the Peking University Department of Chemistry. Chien was a professor and the head of the department.

In 1949, Chien went to Taipei, and was recruited professor of chemistry and the provost of the National Taiwan University, by its then-president Fu Sinian. From 1951 till 1970, Chien was the President of the National Taiwan University.

In 1964, Chien was elected Academician of the Academia Sinica division of physical and mathematical sciences. From 1970 to 1983, Chien served the President of Academia Sinica. In 1983, Chien received honorary doctoral degree from his alma mater UIUC.

From 1971 to 1981, Chien also served the director of the Atomic Energy Council of the Executive Yuan.

Family
Chien's father Chien Hong-ye (錢鴻業) was a Chief Justice in the Supreme Court of the Republic of China, and was assassinated in Shanghai in 1940. Chien had three sons. The eldest, Robert Chien and youngest, Fredrick Chien, became politicians. His second son Shu Chien is a biologist and engineer. A grandson, Carl Chien, is a businessman.

References
 Hudong.com Encyclopedia: Biography of Chien Shih-Liang
 Academia Sinica: The Fifth President -- Chien Shih-Liang
 Chien Shih-Liang and Shu Chien, father and son academicians

1908 births
1983 deaths
Boxer Indemnity Scholarship recipients
Chemists from Zhejiang
Educators from Hangzhou
Members of Academia Sinica
Academic staff of the National Taiwan University
Academic staff of Peking University
Presidents of National Taiwan University
Scientists from Hangzhou
Taiwanese people from Zhejiang
Tianjin Nankai High School alumni
Tsinghua University alumni
University of Illinois Urbana-Champaign alumni